Optimus maximus is Latin for "best [and] greatest". It may refer to:

 Jupiter Optimus Maximus, one of three deities in Rome's Capitoline Triad
 The Temple of Jupiter Optimus Maximus, a temple to that deity in Ancient Rome
 Jupiter Dolichenus also known as Jupiter Optimus Maximus Dolichenus
 The Optimus Maximus keyboard